Astley Bridge is predominantly a residential district of Bolton in Greater Manchester, England.

History 

Astley Bridge is quite a modern place name and only came into general use during the second half of the 19th century. It now refers to the large district in the modern Metropolitan Borough of Bolton, but prior to then it simply meant the bridge over Astley Brook which ran through the lower end of the township of Sharples.

A Local Board of Health for Astley Bridge was constituted in 1864. The District comprised the higher (or detached) portion of Little Bolton and the lower portion of Sharples. After the Public Health Act 1875 was passed by Parliament in that year, Astley Bridge Local Board of Health assumed extra duties as an urban sanitary district, although the Local Board's title did not change. Following the implementation of the Local Government Act 1894, Astley Bridge Local Board was replaced by an elected urban district council in January 1895 but was dissolved in 1898 under the Bolton, Turton and Westhoughton Extension Act and its powers vested in Bolton County Borough Council.

Governance
Since 1974, Astley Bridge has been part of the Metropolitan Borough of Bolton and gives its name to one of Bolton Council's electoral wards, the Astley Bridge ward which includes the Sharples, Bank Top, Eagley Bank, and Horrocks Fold areas. It is represented in Bolton Town Hall by three councillors. The ward is also part of the Bolton North East constituency which has been represented in the House of Commons by the Conservative Party MP Mark Logan since 2019.

Education 
There are five schools in Astley Bridge: St Paul's C.E. Primary School for pupils aged 2–11, Holy Infant and St Anthony RC Primary School, The Oaks Primary School and High Lawn Primary School,  for pupils aged 5–11, and Thornleigh Salesian College for pupils aged 11–18.

Religion sites 

Astley Bridge has a number of religious places of worship: 
 St Paul's Church (CE), Holland Street, Astley Bridge.
 Holy Infant and St Anthony Church (RC), Baxendale Street, Astley Bridge.
 Astley Bridge Baptist Church, Eden Street, Astley Bridge.
 Astley Bridge Methodist, Seymour Road, Astley Bridge.
 Bank Top United Reformed Church, Ashworth Lane, Astley Bridge.
 Gospel Hall, Maxwell Street, Astley Bridge. 
 Lee Clough Mission, Old Road, Astley Bridge.

References

External links 
 Photos and information about Astley Bridge
 

Areas of Bolton